Alan Macmillan (born 1949) is a television producer and director.

Education
Macmillan was educated at Strathallan School and the Birmingham School of Art.

Director
Macmillan started his directing career in the mid-1980s making several documentaries and a docudrama called Charles Rennie Mackintosh: Dreams and Recollections for Scottish Television.  In 1987 he was asked to direct several episodes of Taggart, the Scottish detective series, which he would continue to work on until 2005.  Macmillan was producer and director of Crime Story: The Britoil Affair, which was nominated in the Best Single Drama category at the 1993 BAFTA Scotland Awards.  He also directed numerous episodes of The Bill and most of series six of Ballykissangel.

Filmography

Awards and nominations
1993: Nominated for the Bafta Scotland Award for Best Single Drama for Crime Story: The Britoil Affair.

References

External links
Alan Macmillan official website

Alan Macmillan at the British Film Institute

1949 births
Living people
People educated at Strathallan School
British television producers
British television directors
Alumni of the Birmingham School of Art